Prince Neungpung (Hangul: 능풍군, Hanja: 綾豐君; 1596 - November 1604), personal name Yi Myeong, was a Mid-late Joseon Royal Prince of Korea and the only son of Wonjong of Joseon and Lady of the Pyeongyang Gim clan. He was the younger half brother of Injo of Joseon.

Life
Yi became 4th Officer (부수, 副守) in 1601.  Three years later, in November 1604, he passed away at age 9. Because of his early death, he did not marry. In March 1623, his older half brother, Yi Jong (이종), rebelled and ascended to the throne as King Injo (인조왕), but Myeong did not receive a royal title or posthumous name. Later, in 1872, during the 29th year of the reign of King Gojong, the Prince was given a royal title as Prince Neungpung (능풍군, 綾豐君) and became Yeongjongjeonggyeong (영종정경, 領宗正卿).

The Prince's tomb is located in Naegak-ri, Jeopdong-myeon, Pungyang-hyeon, Yangju-si, Gyeonggi-do (nowadays became the place around Naegak-ri, Jinjeop-eup, Namyangju-si, Gyeonggi-do) but the specific location is unknown.

Family
Father: Wonjong of Joseon (2 August 1580 - 29 December 1619) (조선 원종)
Grandfather: Seonjo of Joseon (26 November 1552 - 16 March 1608) (조선 선조왕)
Grandmother: Royal Noble Consort In of the Suwon Gim clan (1555 - 10 December 1613) (인빈 김씨)
Mother: 
Biological: Lady of the Pyeongyang Gim clan (평양 김씨)
Legal adoptive: Queen Inheon of the Neungseong Gu clan (17 April 1578 - 14 January 1626) (인헌왕후 구씨)
Grandfather: Gu Sa-Maeng, Duke Munui, Internal Prince Neungan (1531 - 1 April 1604) (구사맹 문의공 능안부원군)
Grandmother: Internal Princess Consort Pyeongsan of the Pyeongsan Sin clan (1538 - 1562) (평산부부인 평산 신씨)
Since the Prince died young, so he never married. For descendants House of Yi, some princes listed themselves as his adopted son.
Adopted issue:
Son: Yi Sik, Prince Yeongpung (1628 - 1692) (이식 영풍군) – the first son of Grand Prince Neungwon (능원대군) and Grand Princess Consort of the Yeongam Gim clan (부부인 영암 김씨).
Son: Yi Jeong, Prince Gwangcheon (19 August 1652 - 12 March 1735) (이정 광천군) – the son of Yi Geub, Prince Haeryeong (이급 해령군), the fourth son of Yi Gong, Prince Inseong (이공 인성군) and Princess Consort Yun (군부인 윤씨), the second daughter of Yun Seung-Gil (윤승길).
Grandson: Yi Pyo, Prince Pyeongwon (24 November 1685 - 6 November 1725) (이표 평원군)
Son: Yi Tak, Prince Seongpyeong (1663 - 1713) (이탁 성평군) – the first son of Yi U, Prince Nangseon (이우 낭선군), the oldest son of Yi Yeong, Prince Inheung (이영 인흥군). Prince Inheung was Seonjo of Joseon's 12nd son from his 4th concubine, Royal Noble Consort Jeong of the Yeoheung Min clan.
Grandson: Yi Jeon, Prince Dongeun (1700 - 1755) (이전 동은군)

References

1596 births
1604 deaths
Korean princes
House of Yi
16th-century Korean people
17th-century Korean people
Royalty and nobility who died as children